Yoo Jae-hak (born 20 March 1963) is a South Korean basketball coach, formerly for Ulsan Mobis Phoebus and the Korean national team, which participated at the 2014 FIBA Basketball World Cup. He is currently Ulsan’s general manager. He also competed as a player in the men's tournament at the 1988 Summer Olympics.

References

1963 births
Living people
South Korean men's basketball players
South Korean basketball coaches
Ulsan Hyundai Mobis Phoebus players
Daegu KOGAS Pegasus coaches
Ulsan Hyundai Mobis Phoebus coaches
Kyungbock High School alumni
Yonsei University alumni
Olympic basketball players of South Korea
Basketball players at the 1988 Summer Olympics